Sahrarud (also Romanized as Şaḩrārūd and Şaḩrā Rūd; also known as Şaḩrā) is a village in Sahrarud Rural District, in the Central District of Fasa County, Fars Province, Iran. At the 2006 census, its population was 4,860, in 1,163 families.

References 

Populated places in Fasa County